"Next to You" is a song by American singer Chris Brown, featuring Canadian singer Justin Bieber included as a track on the former's fourth studio album, F.A.M.E., released on June 21, 2011. Brown co-wrote the song with frequent collaborator Sevyn Streeter of American girl group RichGirl. The track is one of the four tracks Brown and Bieber worked together on, the others being a remix of Bieber's "Up" (2011), "Ladies Love Me" contained in Brown's mixtape Boy In Detention (2011), and "Don't Check on Me" from Brown's 2019 album Indigo.

Musically, "Next to You" is a pop and R&B number, with lyrics pertaining to the love between two people in a relationship, and how their deep feeling helps them to overcome difficulties. Music critics reviewed the song positively, complimenting its musicality and lyrics, finding it to be one of the most "pop" moments on F.A.M.E.. After the release of the album, the song appeared on the music charts of the United States, Canada, and the United Kingdom. It was released for digital download on June 24, 2011, as the album's fifth single.

Background

The song was written by Brown and singer Sevyn Streeter. They entirely composed and recorded the track, then Bieber added his vocals on it. In December 2010, Brown tweeted that he would be collaborating with Bieber. The song first appeared online on March 8, 2011. The song was one of three collaborations between Bieber and Brown in 2011, the others being a remix of "Up" from Bieber's My World 2.0 album, which was included as a track on his Never Say Never: The Remixes set, and "Ladies Love Me", contained in Brown's hip hop mixtape Boy In Detention. In an interview with MTV News, Brown revealed that the duo recorded the "Up" remix first, and Brown wanted Bieber on his album after their first collaboration.

Composition

"Next to You" is a pop and R&B song. The song has lyrics about profound love involvement in a relationship helping to overcome difficulties. Eliot Glazer of MTV Buzzworthy said that the song's lyrics mix "inspirational" and "affectionate" themes. It features "digitized" violins. According to the sheet music at Musicnotes.com by Sony/ATV Music Publishing, the song is set in common time with a moderate tempo of 116 beats per minute. It is composed in the key of E major with Bieber and Brown's vocal ranges spanning from the low-note of G3 to the high-note of C6. The song features the chord progression of E–B–Cm–A. Nadia Noir of WNOW-FM said the song was a danceable "love-song." Furthermore, AOL Music's Charley Rogulewski called the song a "dreamy pop love song." The song sees Brown and Bieber trading verses and the chorus in lyrics like "I'll be there when you're insecure/ Let you know that you're always lovely/ Girl, because you are the only thing that I got right now."

Music video

Background
The music video for "Next to You" was directed by Colin Tilley and filmed at the Universal Studios in Los Angeles, and upper Manhattan. On May 10, 2011, Bieber's manager confirmed plans for a music video via Twitter. In an interview with MTV News, Tilley spoke briefly about the video, saying "Tomorrow, I'm shooting New Boyz and Chris Brown ... then Justin Bieber and Chris Brown, together ... I can't tell you anything about that yet, but it's going to happen. It's gonna be big. It's gonna be big. I can't say anything else." On May 21, 2011, Brown posted two photos from the shoot via Twitter, showing him and Bieber standing among overturned cars in a path of destruction. However, the unfinished version of the music video leaked onto the internet on June 6, and the final cut was premiered on June 17, 2011.

Synopsis

The video begins with Brown and Bieber interacting with their girlfriends while the song "All Back" by Chris Brown is playing. Bieber's love interest is removed by her father, who reprimands, "You will never see him again. You understand that?" Brown is thinking of his girlfriend (played by Shannon Elizabeth) before the apocalypse occurs, which is characterized by land fissures, buildings toppling down and fiery scenery. Brown searches for his love interest who is then hit by the car that Bieber's girlfriend is in. Brown tries to save her by leaping over an enormous fissure, but, failing to do so, he falls into it. Near the end of the video, Bieber's girlfriend finds him on top of the roof of a building and it ends with them reuniting and kissing. Interspersed are scenes of Brown and Bieber dancing amongst the destruction. Jamie Peck of MTV wrote of the video, "The whole thing is delightfully ridiculous in its cinematic drama". The video was nominated for International Artist Video of the Year at the 2012 MuchMusic Video Awards.

Critical reception
Brad Wete of Entertainment Weekly coined the song as "thumping" and said that "Brown and guest Justin Bieber trade verses assuring their ladies of their dedication." Joanne Dorken of MTV News UK said "It seems that everything Justin Bieber touches turns to gold at the moment and this cutesy ballad is no exception." Dorken complimented how well the song showed the blending of the pair's voices, and she commented, as "the most 'pop' song on the LP, we are hoping Chris decides to make this a single ... a sure fire hit." Nadia Noir of WNOW-FM wrote, "What do you get when you combine two of pop's best-looking/greatest dancers, the sexy rasp of Justin Bieber, and a dance-jam/love-song? A combination of all the best elements of music!" Nick Levine of BBC Music called the collaboration a "wholesome-as-homemade-chutney hook-up". While commending that the album had "something for everyone", Jody Rosen of Rolling Stone called "Next to You" a "tender love declaration." Bri LaPelusa called the song a "dreamy ballad" and praised the singer's vocal performances, saying that it showcased Brown and Bieber's "angelic" voices. She went on to add that "Next to You" "might be affirmation that Chris Brown is once again an accepted celebrity."

Praising the lyrics, Eliot Glazer of MTV Buzzworthy defined them "affectionate" and "universal". Despite complimenting the record, Eric Henderson of Slant Magazine said Brown was unable to capture the "majesty of 'Forever'" with the "pop-appeal" of the song. Jon Caramanica of The New York Times wrote that the song does compliment Brown's voice, but not Bieber's.

Chart performance
Due to digital sales after the release of F.A.M.E., "Next to You" debuted on the US Billboard Hot 100 and the Canadian Hot 100 charts of the week ending April 9, 2011. The song debuted at number ten on the Hot Digital Songs chart in the US, and at number 26 on the Hot 100. The following week, the song fell to number ninety before falling off the chart the next week. On the Canadian Hot 100, it debuted at number 36, and spent one week on the chart.
                                                                                          
In the United Kingdom, after the release of F.A.M.E., "Next to You" appeared at number forty-nine. It spent one week on the chart. After being released as a single, it appeared on the chart again and eventually peaked at number fourteen. The single was eventually certified gold by the British Phonographic Industry (BPI) for sales of over 400,000 copies in the UK.

Credits and personnel 
Vocals - Chris Brown, Justin Bieber
Writing – Chris Brown, Sevyn Streeter 
Production – The Messengers   
Vocal production – Kuk Harrell   
Vocal recording – Kuk Harrell, Josh Gudwin   
Mixing – Jaycen Joshua, assisted by Jesus Garncia  
Source

Track listing 
The single package of the song contains the official duet from Brown and Bieber, a solo version by Brown, and the b-side song "Talk Ya Ear Off"

Charts

Weekly charts

Certifications

Release history

References

2011 singles
Chris Brown songs
Justin Bieber songs
Pop ballads
Male vocal duets
Music videos directed by Colin Tilley
Songs written by Adam Messinger
Songs written by Nasri (musician)
Songs written by Sevyn Streeter
2010s ballads
Contemporary R&B ballads
2011 songs